Zenari (also Romanized as Zenārī; also known as Zīnār) is a village in Garmeh-ye Jonubi Rural District, in the Central District of Meyaneh County, East Azerbaijan Province, Iran. At the 2006 census, its population was 110, in 27 families.

References 

Populated places in Meyaneh County